The Mongolian vole (Microtus mongolicus) is a species of rodent in the family Cricetidae.
It is found in China, Mongolia, and Russia.

References

 Baillie, J. 1996.  Microtus mongolicus.   2006 IUCN Red List of Threatened Species.   Downloaded on 19 July 2007.
Musser, G. G. and M. D. Carleton. 2005. Superfamily Muroidea. pp. 894–1531 in Mammal Species of the World a Taxonomic and Geographic Reference. D. E. Wilson and D. M. Reeder eds. Johns Hopkins University Press, Baltimore.

Microtus
Mammals described in 1861
Taxa named by Gustav Radde
Taxonomy articles created by Polbot